Glipidiomorpha ideodorsalis is a species of beetle in the genus Glipidiomorpha of the family Mordellidae. It was described in 1955 by Mario E. Franciscolo.

References

Beetles described in 1955
Mordellidae